Michel Bénard ( – ?) was a councillor of the Conseil Supérieur of New France.

From 1736 to 1748, Bénard was first secretary to the Intendant of New France, Gilles Hocquart. In 1757 he was made a regular councillor of the Sovereign Council, an office he held until the Conquest.

References 
 

1710s births
Year of death unknown
People of New France